Bernhard Vogel (born 19 December 1932) is a German politician of the Christian Democratic Union (CDU). He was the 4th Minister President of Rhineland-Palatinate from 1976 to 1988 and the 2nd Minister President of Thuringia from 1992 to 2003. He is the only person to have been head of two different German federal states and is the longest-governing Minister President of Germany. He served as the 28th and 40th President of the Bundesrat in 1976/77 and 1987/88.

Early life and education 
Vogel was born in Göttingen. He received his Abitur in Munich in 1953, and began studies in political science, history, sociology, and economics, first in Heidelberg and then in Munich. He received his doctorate in 1960, while working as a research assistant at the Institute of Political Science at the University of Heidelberg. He became a lecturer there the following year, also working in adult education.

Political career
In 1963, Vogel was elected to the municipal council of Heidelberg, but resigned two years later, following his election to the Bundestag. He joined the governing board of the Christian Democratic Union of Germany in the Rhineland Palatinate in 1965. From 1965 to 1967, Vogel was a member of the German Bundestag, a position from which he resigned to assume the job of State Minister of Culture and Education in Rhineland-Palatinate under Minister President Peter Altmeier. He continued in the same cabinet position under Altmeier's successor in 1969, Helmut Kohl. In 1973, when Kohl became chair of the national CDU, Vogel succeeded him as state party chair in Rhineland-Palatinate.

In December 1976, Vogel became Minister-President of Rhineland-Palatinate to replace Kohl, who had been elected a federal deputy. Vogel immediately assumed the presidency of the Federal Council until 31 October 1977, at the same time becoming chairman of the supervisory board of the Zweites Deutsches Fernsehen (ZDF), Germany's second largest public broadcaster. In the regional elections of March 1979 he maintained a bare majority of his party, with 50% of the vote and 51 regional deputies out of 100. In March 1983 the party improved its position, obtaining 52% of the vote and 57 deputies. Vogel became vice-president of the European Democratic Union (EDU) in 1985 and again won the regional elections on 17 May 1987 but with only a plurality of 45.1% of the vote and 48 deputies elected out of 100, ending the sixteen-year absolute majority of Christian Democrats. Vogel's failure to be re-elected as state chair of his party in 1988 led to his resignation as Minister President in a famous speech which he ended with the often-quoted phrase: "May God protect Rhineland-Palatinate!", an unusual display of public piety by German standards.

After his resignation, Vogel concentrated on the management of the Konrad Adenauer Foundation, of which he became chairman in 1989. After the resignation of the first Thuringian Prime Minister Josef Duchač 1992, Vogel became Minister-President of Thuringia on 5 February. From 1993 to 1999 he was chairman of the Thuringian CDU. He gave up the chairmanship of the Adenauer Foundation in 1995. 1994 CDU and SPD formed a grand coalition. In the 1999 elections, the CDU achieved an absolute majority. For reasons of age, Vogel resigned from office as Minister-President on 5 June 2003. His was followed by Dieter Althaus.

Life after politics 
From 2001 until 2009, Vogel served again as president of the Konrad Adenauer Foundation in Berlin.

In 2012 Vogel was awarded the Mercator Visiting Professorship for Political Management at the Universität Essen-Duisburg's NRW School of Governance. He gave both seminars and lectures at the university.

Vogel was nominated by his party as delegate to the Federal Convention for the purpose of electing the President of Germany in 2022.

Other activities

Corporate boards
 Deutsche Vermögensberatung (DVAG), member of the advisory board

Non-profit organizations
 donum vitae, Member of the Board of Trustees (since 2001)
 CARE Deutschland-Luxemburg, member of the board of trustees
 Eugen Biser Foundation, member of the board of trustees
 European Foundation for the Speyer Cathedral, member of the board of trustees
 Konrad Adenauer Foundation (KAS), member of the board of trustees
 Willy Brandt Foundation, member of the board of trustees

Personal life 
Vogel is a devout Roman Catholic. He is single and has no children. His brother was the SPD politician Hans-Jochen Vogel (1926–2020), a former mayor of Munich and Berlin, federal minister of justice and candidate for chancellorship.

References

 

1932 births
Living people
Grand Crosses 1st class of the Order of Merit of the Federal Republic of Germany
Presidents of the German Bundesrat
Members of the Landtag of Rhineland-Palatinate
Members of the Landtag of Thuringia
German Roman Catholics
Members of the Bundestag for Rhineland-Palatinate
Politicians from Göttingen
People from the Province of Hanover
Ministers-President of Rhineland Palatinate
Ministers-President of Thuringia
State ministers of Rhineland-Palatinate
Members of the Bundestag for the Christian Democratic Union of Germany
Members of the Bundestag 1965–1969